Thubana melitopyga is a moth in the family Lecithoceridae. It was described by Edward Meyrick in 1923. It is found in Sri Lanka.

The wingspan is about 18 mm. The forewings are dark purple grey and the hindwings are dark grey.

References

Moths described in 1923
Thubana